The Kiribati Red Cross Society was founded in 1965. It has its headquarters in Bairiki, Kiribati.

External links
Kiribati Red Cross Society Profile

 

Red Cross and Red Crescent national societies
1965 establishments in the Gilbert and Ellice Islands
Organizations established in 1965
Medical and health organisations based in Kiribati